One of the Live Earth concerts in Japan was held at Tō-ji, Kyoto on 7 July 2007.

Running order
Rip Slyme - "One (CHRISTMAS CLASSIC VERSION)", "Nettaiya (Tropical Night)", "Rakuen Baby (Paradise Baby)", "Unmei Kyodotai (Unity of Fate)" (K 03:06)
UA - "Tori (Bird)", "Moor" (K 04:06))
Bonnie Pink - "Heaven's Kitchen", "Chances Are", "Souldiers", "Water Me" (K 05:06)
Michael Nyman - "Franklyn", "Big My Secret", "Silver Fingered Fling", "If", "The Departure", "Jack" (K 06:06)
Yellow Magic Orchestra - "Ishindenshin", "Rescue", "War and Peace", "Rydeen" (K 07:06)

Coverage
MSN held the online broadcasting of the concert.

External links
Official Live Earth Web Site
MSN Live Earth Site
Official Live Earth blog

Kyoto
2007 in music
Rock festivals in Japan
2007 in Japan
Culture in Kyoto Prefecture